Khalifeh Kandi is a village in Sarajuy-ye Shomali Rural District, in the Central District of Maragheh County, East Azerbaijan Province, Iran. At the 2006 census, its population was 504, in 111 families.

References 

Towns and villages in Maragheh County